The Horatio P. Van Cleve House is a house in the Marcy-Holmes neighborhood of Minneapolis, Minnesota, United States.  The house contains elements of the Greek Revival and Italianate styles.  It was originally built for William Kimball, a furniture manufacturer; the Van Cleves were the second owners.  Horatio P. Van Cleve served as colonel of the 2nd Minnesota Volunteer Infantry Regiment and later a general during the American Civil War.

His wife, Charlotte Ouisconsin Clark Van Cleve, was the mother of 12 children, a women's suffrage advocate, and the first woman elected to the Minneapolis School Board.  She was also a social reformer who founded an organization to help "erring women" in 1875.  The house is listed on the National Register of Historic Places.

References

Houses completed in 1858
Houses in Minneapolis
Houses on the National Register of Historic Places in Minnesota
National Register of Historic Places in Minneapolis